The Woodhaven-Brownstown School District in Michigan headquartered in Woodhaven in Metro Detroit. It consists of eight separate schools and students from both the City of Woodhaven and Brownstown Township can attend the district. The district offers grades K–12 with five elementary schools, two middle schools and a high school.

Schools

Elementary schools
There are five elementary schools in the Woodhaven-Brownstown School District. All of the elementary schools offer grades K–5.

Bates Elementary School
Bates Elementary was founded by Raymond G. Bates in September 1957. Bates is located on 22811 Gudith Road. The principal of Bates is C. Godfrey.

Erving Elementary School
Erving Elementary was named after Mary Quick Erving. She had served on the first school board in 1924 and continued to serve for 22 more years. Erving Elementary is located on 24175 Hall Road and the principal is Mrs. C. Berry.

Gudith Elementary School
Gudith Elementary was named after the Gudith family. John Gudith was involved in school board matters for 29 years and William Gudith was involved for 38 years. The site of the elementary school was the original site of the Gudith's family home. Gudith Elementary is located at 22700 Sibley Road and the principal is Mr. T. Martin.

Wegienka Elementary School
Wegienka Elementary was named in honor of Mark Wegienka. After completing his formal education, Mr. Wegienka entered the education profession at Eurekadale School in 1941. In 1943, he was named teacher-principal of Hand School, and became superintendent of that district in 1954. In 1968, Mr. Wegienka was appointed first superintendent of the newly formed Woodhaven School District, a post he held until his retirement in 1976. Wegienka is located at 23925 Arsenal Road and the principal is Mrs. M. Briegel.

Yake Elementary School
Yake Elementary was named after Elin Christine Yake who was an immigrant from Sweden. She was very active in the schools and helped get Bates Elementary built. Yake Elementary is located at 16400 Carter Road and the principal is Mr. T. Podlewski.

Middle schools
There are two middle schools in the Woodhaven-Brownstown school district. Brownstown Middle School offers grades 6–7. It is located at 20135 Inkster Road and its principal is Mr. A. Clark. The assistant principal is Mrs. E. Radtka.

The other middle school is Patrick Henry Middle School which offers grades 8–9. Patrick Henry Middle School was named in honor of Patrick Henry. Patrick Henry Middle School is located at 24825 Hall Road. Its principal is Mr. R. Gurganus and the assistant principal is Dr. Peggy Carr-McMicheal.

High school
Woodhaven High School opened in the Fall of 1972. It is located at 24787 Van Horn Road. Its principal is Mr. M. Czajkowski and assistant principals are Mr. Jay Vesperman and Mr. Phil Short. In 2022,the class of 1972 was honored at the Homecoming football game for the 50th anniversary of the school.

Alternative Education
Maple Grove Alternative High School provides an online learning program with in-person tutoring that allows students to earn a high school diploma while completing most of their work on a computer at home. In school operations are held at Woodhaven High School.

History
The Woodhaven-Brownstown School District was founded in 1968. Before the district was in place, students attended Bates Elementary until seventh grade and then attended Trenton School District schools. In the late 1960s the Carson School District, the Hand School District, and the Maple Grove School District and the Brownstown #10 School District were ordered by court to join together to form one school district which offered grades K-12. The school district was then renamed to the Woodhaven-Brownstown School District.

References

External links

School districts in Michigan
Education in Wayne County, Michigan
1968 establishments in Michigan
School districts established in 1968